Qasrodasht Metro Station is a station on Shiraz Metro Line 1. The station opened on 11 October 2014. It is located on Qasrodasht Square between Shahed Metro Station and Shahid Motahhari Metro Station.

Shiraz Metro stations
Railway stations opened in 2014